The Cahuilla, also known as ʔívil̃uqaletem or Ivilyuqaletem, are a Native American people of the various tribes of the Cahuilla Nation, living in the inland areas of southern California. The traditional Cahuilla territory was near the geographic center of Southern California. It was bounded to the north by the San Bernardino Mountains, to the south by Borrego Springs and the Chocolate Mountains, to the east by the Colorado Desert, and to the west by the San Jacinto Plain and the eastern slopes of the Palomar Mountains.

Language and name
The Cahuilla language is in the Uto-Aztecan family. A 1990 census revealed 35 speakers in an ethnic population of 800. It is critically endangered, since most speakers are middle-aged or older. In their own language, their autonym is ʔívil̃uqaletem, and the name of their language is ʔívil̃uʔat (Ivilyuat), however they also call themselves táxliswet meaning 'person'. Cahuilla is an exonym applied to the group after mission secularization in the Ranchos of California. The word "Cahuilla" is probably from the Ivilyuat word kawi'a, meaning "master."

Prehistory

Oral legends suggest that when the Cahuilla first moved into the Coachella Valley, a large body of water which geographers call Lake Cahuilla was in existence. Fed by the Colorado River, it dried up sometime before 1700, following one of the repeated shifts in the river's course. In 1905 a break in a levee created the much smaller Salton Sea in the same location.

The Cahuilla lived from the land by using native plants. A notable tree whose fruits they harvested is the California fan palm. The Cahuilla also used palm leaves for basketry of many shapes, sizes and purposes; sandals, and roofing thatch for dwellings. The Cahuilla lived in smaller groups than some other tribes.

History
The first encounter with Europeans was in 1774, when Juan Bautista de Anza was looking for a trade route between Sonora and Monterey in Alta California. Living far inland, the Cahuilla had little contact with Spanish soldiers, priests, or missionaries. Many of the Europeans viewed the desert as having little or no value, but rather a place to avoid. The Cahuilla learned of Spanish missions and their culture from Indians living close to missions in San Gabriel and San Diego. The Cahuilla provided security against the raids of the tribes from the desert and mountains on its herds for the vaqueros that worked for the owners of the Rancho San Bernardino.

The Cahuilla did not encounter Anglo-Americans until the 1840s. Chief Juan Antonio, leader of the Cahuilla Mountain Band, gave traveler Daniel Sexton access to areas near the San Gorgonio Pass in 1842. The Mountain Band also lent support to a U.S. Army expedition led by Lieutenant Edward Fitzgerald Beale, defending the party against attacks by Wakara and his band of Ute warriors.

During the Mexican–American War, Chief Juan Antonio led his warriors to join Californios led by José del Carmen Lugo in attacking their traditional enemy, the Luiseño. Lugo led this action in retaliation for the Pauma Massacre, in which the Luiseno had killed 11 Californios. The combined forces staged an ambush and killed 33–40 of the Luiseno warriors, an event that became known as the Temecula Massacre of 1847. (Academic historians disagree on the exact number of deaths, the estimate is 33–40; Luiseno oral tradition holds that more than 100 warriors were killed.) In the treaty ending the war with Mexico, the US promised to honor Mexican land grants and policies. These included recognition of Native American rights to inhabit certain lands, but European-American encroachment on Indian lands became an increasing problem after the US annexed California.

During the 1850s, the Cahuilla came under increasing pressure from waves of European-American migrants because of the California Gold Rush. In 1851, Juan Antonio led his warriors in the destruction of the Irving Gang, a group of bandits that had been looting the San Bernardino Valley. Following the outcome of the Irving Gang incident, in late 1851, Juan Antonio, his warriors and their families, moved eastward from Politana, toward the San Gorgonio Pass and settled in a valley which branched off to the northeast from San Timoteo Canyon, at a village named Saahatpa.

In addition to the influx of Anglo-American miners, ranchers and outlaws, and groups of Mormon colonists, the Cahuilla came into conflict with the neighboring Cupeño tribe to the west. In November 1851, the Garra Revolt occurred, wherein the Cupeno leader Antonio Garra attempted to bring Juan Antonio into his revolt. Juan Antonio, friendly to the Americans, was instrumental in capturing Antonio Garra, ending that revolt.

When the California Senate refused to ratify an 1852 treaty granting the Cahuilla control of their lands, some tribal leaders resorted to attacks on approaching settlers and soldiers. Juan Antonio did not participate in this as long as he lived.

To encourage the railroad, the U.S. government subdivided the lands into one-mile-square sections, giving the Indians every other section. In 1877 the government established reservation boundaries, which left the Cahuilla with only a small portion of their traditional territories.

The Cahuilla have intermarried with non-Cahuilla for the past century. A high percentage of today's Cahuilla tribal members have some degree of mixed ancestry, especially Spanish and African American. Individuals who have grown up in the tribe's ways and identify culturally with the Cahuilla may qualify for official tribal membership by the tribe's internal rules. Each federally recognized tribe sets its own rules for membership.

Current status
Today Palm Springs and the surrounding areas are experiencing rapid development. The Agua Caliente Band of the Cahuilla is an important player in the local economy, operating an array of business enterprises, including land leasing, hotel and casino operations, and banking.

The Agua Caliente Indian Reservation occupies  in the Palm Springs area, including parts of the cities of Palm Springs, Cathedral City, and Rancho Mirage. The total population living on its territory was 21,358 persons as of the 2000 census, although few of these are registered tribal members.

The Morongo Band of Mission Indians, also considered part of the Cahuilla nation, operates the Morongo Casino, Resort & Spa, as well as the Hadley Fruit Orchards in Cabazon. The Morongo Casino is one of the largest Indian casinos in the United States. The Morongo Indian Reservation is located in northern Riverside County. The city of Banning and community of Cabazon both extend partially onto reservation land.

Smaller bands of Cahuilla are located in Southern California: the Augustine Band in Coachella (their village was La Mesa in the 1880s-90s); the Cabazon Band in Indio (their one square mile reservation now "Sonora-Lupine Lanes" in Old Town Indio); the Cabazon Reservations in Indio, Coachella and Mecca (separate from Cabazon band); the Cahuilla Band in Anza; the Los Coyotes Band in Warner Springs (San Diego County); the Ramona Indian Reservation in Pine Meadow; Santa Rosa Indian Reservation in Pinyon; the Twentynine Palms Band in Twentynine Palms, Indio and Coachella ("Dates Lane" community); the Torres-Martinez Band in La Quinta (was Rancho Santa Carmelita in Spanish-Mexican-1850s California times), Coachella, Thermal, Mecca and Oasis; and the Mission Creek Reservation in Desert Hot Springs.

The Torres-Martinez tribe has offices throughout Southern California, offering TANF (Temporary Assistance for Needy Families) benefits for members. They are in Imperial Valley (El Centro), Blythe, Riverside, San Bernardino, Victorville, Palmdale, San Diego, Orange County (Santa Ana), Pomona and Los Angeles. This is a result of Cahuilla migration to farming and factory jobs in the late half of the 20th century.

Extinct Cahuilla tribes (known as the Las Palmas band of Cahuilla-part of "Western Cahuilla") in the early 20th century resided in the Palm Desert area (between Thousand Palms, Cathedral City and La Quinta). This was before land developers and US Armed Forces purchased what was tribal land from the Montoya family-part of the "Desert Cahuilla" in present-day Indian Wells and from the San Cayetano band-part of "Desert Cahuilla" in Rancho San Cayetano during the Spanish-Mexican-1850s California period (now the city of Rancho Mirage). The number of these tribes' descendants is unknown. The Montoya family, who claim partial Cahuilla descent, are influential in local economics and city politics. 

The ethnic composition of the Cahuilla descendants is like that of many other Americans: mixed with European (especially Anglo/Irish-American and Spanish), African American, Asian-American (from historic interaction with Chinese railroad workers and Filipino farm laborers), and other tribal groups, mainly Apache migrant workers from Arizona. Some Cahuilla families continue to intermarry with local populations; others try to marry within Native American tribes.

UC Riverside land acknowledgement 
 
Many universities and companies have released land acknowledgments recently to acknowledge years of oppression brought onto the Indigenous people of the United States. These formally released statements are intended to show respect to Indigenous peoples and their relationship to the land while simultaneously recognizing the fact that Indigenous peoples have been stripped from the territories upon which the institution was built upon and presently  resides. The University of California, Riverside has officially published a land acknowledgement stating that the university was built on and still occupies indigenous land. The Cahuilla, among many other tribes, were mentioned in this particular land acknowledgement.

Being situated in Riverside California, UCR resides in Riverside County where the Cahuilla people resided, nearly an hour and a half drive from the desert basins near the San Jacinto Mountains where the Cahuilla people originally lived. In their land acknowledgement UCR expresses the importance and the responsibility they have to respect the Indigenous peoples of the land.

Federally recognized tribes
The Cahuilla have been historically divided into "Mountain," "Desert," and "(San Gorgonio) Pass / Western" groups by anthropologists. Today there are nine Southern California reservations that are acknowledged homes to bands of Cahuilla. These are located in Imperial, Riverside and San Diego counties and are the territory of federally recognized tribes.

The Cahuilla bands (sometimes called "villages") are:

"Pass" Cahuilla or "Western" Cahuilla (on San Gorgonio Pass, centering in Palm Springs and Palm Desert in Coachella Valley, wandering north to Desert Hot Springs)
 Agua Caliente Band of Cahuilla Indians of the Agua Caliente Indian Reservation (main clans: Kawasic/Kauisik/Kauisiktum ("fox or rock People", at Palm Springs area), Painakic/Panic/Paniktum (″People of Daylight″, of Andreas and Murray Canyons), Atcitcem/Ahchechem (″People of Good″, of Lower Palm Canyon, later at Indian Wells), Wanikik/Wainikik (″Running Water People″, Snowcreek and Whitewater Canyon, now most part of Morongo Band), and another clan (its identity has been lost), headquarters at Palm Springs, California (Cahuilla: Se-Khi/Sec-he - ″boiling water″), the Spanish who arrived named it Agua Caliente - ″hot water″) 
 Morongo Band of Cahuilla Mission Indians of the Morongo Reservation (Wanikik/Wainikik and Kawasic/Kauisik/Kauisiktum clan, and Serrano, tribal members also include Cupeño, Luiseño, and Chemehuevi Indians, headquarters at Banning, California.)
 Mission Creek Band (Kilyinakiktum and Wanikik/Wainikik clans and the mixed Cahuilla-Serrano clan Marongam (in Serrano: Morongo), Serrano, and Cupeño peoples, headquarters at Desert Hot Springs, California on Mission Creek (Yamesével), a tributary of the Whitewater River north of the Salton Sea)
"Mountain" Cahuilla (Santa Rosa and San Jacinto Mountains)
 Cahuilla Band of Mission Indians of the Cahuilla Reservation (Natcutakiktum (″Sand People″, from Horse Canyon), headquartered at Anza, California)
 Los Coyotes Band of Cahuilla and Cupeno Indians of the Los Coyotes Reservation (first Wiwaiistam (″Coyote People″, from Coyote Canyon) (and Sauicpakiktum/Sawish-pakiktem lineage  - later Isilsiveyyaiutcem clan although, and Cupeño, headquarters at Warner Springs, California)
 Ramona Band of Cahuilla Mission Indians (Apapatcem (″Medicine People″) clan, headquarters at Anza, California) 
 Santa Rosa Band of Cahuilla Indians (original dominated by the Costakiktum/Costai-kiktem and Natcutakiktum, together with Pauatiauitcem/Pauata-kiktum, Tepamokiktum, and Temewhanic (″Northerners″), later Guanche-pakiktem and some Sauicpakiktum/Sawish-pakiktem (from Rockhouse Canyon) clans, headquarters at Hemet, California)
"Desert" Cahuilla (deserts of northern Lake Cahuilla area)
 Augustine Band of Cahuilla Indians (Nanxaiyem clan (originally a "Pass" Cahuilla clan), headquarters at Coachella, California)
 Cabazon Band of Mission Indians (Kawisiktum, Kaunukalkiktum (″Living at kaunukvela People), Iviatim (″Cahuilla language speaking People″), Telakiktum, Mumkwitcem (″Always sick People″), Palpunivikiktum (″People living at water, circling territory″), Tamolanitcem/Tamulanitcum (″Knees bent Together People″), Tevivakiktum (″Round Basket People″), Tuikikiktum (″People at Tuikiktumhemki village″, subordinate the Kauwicpameauitcem) clans, late 19th century although Wantcinakik Tamianawitcem territory, through Chief Cabazon the Kauwicpameauitcem (″Caught By the Rock People″) clan dominated this area, headquarters at Indio, California, called Pàl téwet)
 Torres-Martinez Desert Cahuilla Indians (own name: ″Mau-Wal-Mah Su-Kutt Menyil″, or ″Deer Moon Among the Palms″, Panakauissiktum (″water fox People″), Palpunivikiktum, Tamolanitcem/Tamulanitcum and later Sawalakiktum, Wakaikiktum (″Night Heron People″, which in turn became Panakauissiktum), and Sewahilem (″Mesquite that is not sweet People″) clans (Torres (Toro) area; Maulma/Mauulmii - ″among the palms″) and Mumletcem (″Mixed Up People″), Masuwitcem (″Long Hairs in the Nose People″), Wiitem (″Grasshoppers People″), Wantcauem (″Touched By the River People″), Autaatem (″High Up People″), Awilem (″Dogs People″), Watcinakiktum/Wantcinakiktum clans (later known as Isilsiveyyaiutcem, subordinate Awilem clan), and late 1870s Sauicpakiktum/Sawish-pakiktem (Martinez & Martinez Canyon area; Soqut Menyily/So-kut Men-yil - "Lady moon [figure in creation myth]") clans, and Chemehuevi Indians, headquarters at Thermal, California, Telmuva - "dark resin or sap from mesquite tree")

Notable Cahuilla
 Juan Antonio (Cahuilla Band, 1783-1863), major chief of the Mountain Cahuilla
 Ramona Lubo (1865-1922), basketmaker and icon of Helen Hunt Jackson's novel Ramona
 Marigold Linton (Morongo Band, b. 1936), cognitive psychologist
 John Tortes "Chief" Meyers (Cahuilla Band, 1880–1971), Major League baseball catcher
 Katherine Siva Saubel (Los Coyotes, 1920–2011), language preservationist and former tribal chairperson
 Gerald Clarke (Cahuilla Band), Artist and educator
 Tahquitz (Agua Caliente), an evil Shaman.

See also

 Agua Caliente Cultural Museum
 Cahuilla mythology
 Cahuilla traditional narratives
 Golden Checkerboard
 Muut
 O. M. Wozencraft negotiated the Treaty of Temecula on January 5, 1852.

References

Sources
  
 Bean, Lowell John. (1978) "Cahuilla", in California, edited by Robert F. Heizer, pp. 575–587. Handbook of North American Indians, William C. Sturtevant, general editor, vol. 8. Smithsonian Institution, Washington, D.C.
 Bean, Lowell John, Sylvia Brakke Vane, and Jackson Young. (1991) The Cahuilla Landscape: The Santa Rosa and San Jacinto Mountains. Menlo Park, CA: Ballena Press
 Hogan, C. Michael. 2009. California Fan Palm: Washingtonia filifera, GlobalTwitcher.com, ed. Nicklas Stromberg
 Kroeber, A. L. (1925) Handbook of the Indians of California. Bureau of American Ethnology Bulletin No. 78. Washington, D.C.
 James, Harry C. (1969) The Cahuilla Indians, Banning, CA: Malki Museum Press, .

Further reading
 Apodaca, Paul (with Luke Madrigal). 1999. "Cahuilla bird songs", California Chronicles, 2(2): 4-8.
  
  
   – includes a photograph of Katherine Siva Saubel (p. 155) and drawings by Carl Eytel of Indian houses, wells, basket granaries and ollas (pp. 174–5).
 Kroeber, A.L. (1908) Ethnography of the Cahuilla Indians. Kessinger Publishing, LLC (2007 reprint)

External links

 Home page Agua Caliente Band
 Home page Augustine Band
 Cabazon Band
 Home page Cahuilla Band
 Los Coyotes Band of Cahuilla and Cupeno Indians contacts
 Home page Morongo Band
 Home page Ramona Band
 Home page Santa Rosa Band
 Home page Torres Martinez Desert Cahuilla Indians
 Frazer, Robert W. (ed.) (1976). "Lovell's Report on the Cahuilla Indians: 1854." The Journal of San Diego History 22 (1).
 Agua Caliente Reservation and Morongo Reservation, California United States Census Bureau

 
California Mission Indians
Native American tribes in Riverside County, California
Native American tribes in California
Colorado Desert